USS Vencedor (SP-669)  was a United States Navy patrol vessel in commission from 1917 to 1918.

Vencedor was built as the private motorboat Tekla by George Lawley & Son at Neponset, Massachusetts, in 1909. She later was renamed Vencedor.

On 19 June 1917, the U.S. Navy acquired Vencedor under a free lease from her owner, Herbert H. Luedinghaus, for use as a section patrol boat during World War I. She was commissioned at the New York Navy Yard in Brooklyn, New York, as USS Vencedor (SP-669) on 30 August 1917.

Assigned to the 3rd Naval District and operating from Section Base No. 6, Vencedor carried out harbor patrol duties into the summer of 1918. She then changed roles and began towing targets and operating as a dispatch boat for the rest of World War I.

Vencedor was decommissioned at City Island in the Bronx, New York, on 26 February 1919 and returned to Luedinghaus. Sources differ on the date of her return to Luedinghams, stating both 25 and 26 February 1919 as the date of her return; the 25 February 1919 return date calls into question the accuracy of the 26 February decommissioning date claimed for her, as decommissioning presumably would occur before or simultaneously with her return to her owner.

Notes

References

Department of the Navy Naval History and Heritage Command Online Library of Selected Images: U.S. Navy Ships: USS Vencedor (SP-669), 1917-1919. Previously the Motor Boat Tekla and Vencedor (1909)
NavSource Online: Section Patrol Craft Photo Archive Vencedor (SP 669)
 
Service Record of Herbert H. Luedinghaus 
Service Record of Herbert H. Luedinghaus, Ensign 

Patrol vessels of the United States Navy
World War I patrol vessels of the United States
Ships built in Boston
1909 ships